

Events

Pre–1600
 211 – Following the death of the Roman Emperor Septimius Severus at Eboracum (modern York, England) while preparing to lead a campaign against the Caledonians, the empire is left in the control of his two quarrelling sons, Caracalla and Geta, whom he had instructed to make peace.
 960 – The coronation of Zhao Kuangyin as Emperor Taizu of Song, initiating the Song dynasty period of China that would last more than three centuries.
1169 – A strong earthquake strikes the Ionian coast of Sicily, causing tens of thousands of injuries and deaths, especially in Catania.
1454 – Thirteen Years' War: The Secret Council of the Prussian Confederation sends a formal act of disobedience to the Grand Master of the Teutonic Knights, sparking the Thirteen Years' War.
1555 – John Rogers is burned at the stake, becoming the first English Protestant martyr under Mary I of England.

1601–1900
1703 – In Edo (now Tokyo), all but one of the Forty-seven Ronin commit seppuku (ritual suicide) as recompense for avenging their master's death.
1758 – The city of Macapá in Brazil is founded by Sebastião Veiga Cabral.
1789 – George Washington is unanimously elected as the first President of the United States by the U.S. Electoral College.
1794 – The French legislature abolishes slavery throughout all territories of the French First Republic. It would be reestablished in the French West Indies in 1802.
1797 – The Riobamba earthquake strikes Ecuador, causing up to 40,000 casualties.
1801 – John Marshall is sworn in as Chief Justice of the United States.
1810 – Napoleonic Wars: Britain seizes Guadeloupe.
1820 – The Chilean Navy under the command of Lord Cochrane completes the two-day long Capture of Valdivia with just 300 men and two ships.
1825 – The Ohio Legislature authorizes the construction of the Ohio and Erie Canal and the Miami and Erie Canal.
1846 – The first Mormon pioneers make their exodus from Nauvoo, Illinois, westward towards Salt Lake Valley.
1859 – The Codex Sinaiticus is discovered in Egypt.
1861 – American Civil War: In Montgomery, Alabama, delegates from six breakaway U.S. states meet and initiate the process that would form the Confederate States of America on February 8.
1899 – The Philippine–American War begins when four Filipino soldiers enter the "American Zone" in Manila, igniting the Battle of Manila.

1901–present
1932 – Second Sino-Japanese War: Harbin, Manchuria, falls to Japan.
1938 – Adolf Hitler appoints himself as head of the Armed Forces High Command.
1941 – The United Service Organization (USO) is created to entertain American troops.
1945 – World War II: Santo Tomas Internment Camp is liberated from Japanese authority.
  1945   – World War II: The Yalta Conference between the "Big Three" (Churchill, Roosevelt, and Stalin) opens at the Livadia Palace in the Crimea.
  1945   – World War II: The British Indian Army and Imperial Japanese Army begin a series of battles known as the Battle of Pokoku and Irrawaddy River operations.
1948 – Ceylon (later renamed Sri Lanka) becomes independent within the British Commonwealth.
1961 – The Angolan War of Independence and the greater Portuguese Colonial War begin.
1966 – All Nippon Airways Flight 60 plunges into Tokyo Bay, killing 133.
1967 – Lunar Orbiter program: Lunar Orbiter 3 lifts off from Cape Canaveral's Launch Complex 13 on its mission to identify possible landing sites for the Surveyor and Apollo spacecraft.
1974 – The Symbionese Liberation Army kidnaps Patty Hearst in Berkeley, California.
  1974   – M62 coach bombing: The Provisional Irish Republican Army (IRA) explodes a bomb on a bus carrying off-duty British Armed Forces personnel in Yorkshire, England. Nine soldiers and three civilians are killed.
1975 – Haicheng earthquake (magnitude 7.3 on the Richter scale) occurs in Haicheng, Liaoning, China.
1976 – In Guatemala and Honduras an earthquake kills more than 22,000.
1977 – A Chicago Transit Authority elevated train rear-ends another and derails, killing 11 and injuring 180, the worst accident in the agency's history.
1992 – A coup d'état is led by Hugo Chávez against Venezuelan President Carlos Andrés Pérez.
1997 – En route to Lebanon, two Israeli Sikorsky CH-53 troop-transport helicopters collide in mid-air over northern Galilee, Israel, killing 73.
  1997   – The Bojnurd earthquake measuring  6.5 strikes Iran. With a Mercalli intensity of VIII, it kills at least 88 and damages 173 villages.
1998 – The 5.9  Afghanistan earthquake shakes the Takhar Province with a maximum Mercalli intensity of VII (Very strong). With 2,323 killed, and 818 injured, damage is considered extreme.
1999 – Unarmed West African immigrant Amadou Diallo is shot 41 times by four plainclothes New York City police officers on an unrelated stake-out, inflaming race relations in the city.
2000 – The World Summit Against Cancer for the New Millennium, Charter of Paris is signed by the President of France, Jacques Chirac and the Director General of UNESCO, Koichiro Matsuura, initiating World Cancer Day which is held on February 4 every year.
2003 – The Federal Republic of Yugoslavia adopts a new constitution, becoming a loose confederacy between Montenegro and Serbia.
2004 – Facebook, a mainstream online social networking site, is founded by Mark Zuckerberg and Eduardo Saverin.
2015 – TransAsia Airways Flight 235, with 58 people on board, en route from the Taiwanese capital Taipei to Kinmen, crashes into the Keelung River just after takeoff, killing 43 people.
2020 – The COVID-19 pandemic causes all casinos in Macau to be closed down for 15 days.

Births

Pre–1600
1447 – Lodovico Lazzarelli, Italian poet (d. 1500)
1495 – Francesco II Sforza, Duke of Milan (d. 1535)
  1495   – Jean Parisot de Valette, Grand Master of the Knights Hospitaller (d. 1568)
1505 – Mikołaj Rej, Polish poet and author (d. 1580)
1575 – Pierre de Bérulle, French cardinal and theologian, founded the French school of spirituality (d. 1629)

1601–1900
1646 – Hans Erasmus Aßmann, German poet and politician (d. 1699)
1676 – Giacomo Facco, Italian violinist and composer (d. 1753)
1677 – Johann Ludwig Bach, German violinist and composer (d. 1731)
1688 – Pierre de Marivaux, French author and playwright (d. 1763)
1725 – Dru Drury, English entomologist and author (d. 1804)
1740 – Carl Michael Bellman, Swedish poet and composer (d. 1795)
1778 – Augustin Pyramus de Candolle, Swiss botanist, mycologist, and academic (d. 1841)
1799 – Almeida Garrett, Portuguese journalist and author (d. 1854)
1818 – Emperor Norton, San Francisco eccentric and visionary (d. 1880)
1831 – Oliver Ames, American financier and politician, 35th Governor of Massachusetts (d. 1895)
1848 – Jean Aicard, French poet, author, and playwright (d. 1921)
1849 – Jean Richepin, French poet, author, and playwright (d. 1926)
1862 – Édouard Estaunié, French novelist (d. 1942)
1865 – Abe Isoo, Japanese minister and politician (d. 1949)
1868 – Constance Markievicz, Irish revolutionary and first woman elected to the UK House of Commons (d. 1927)
1869 – Bill Haywood, American labor organizer (d. 1928)
1871 – Friedrich Ebert, German lawyer and politician, first President of Germany (d. 1925)
1872 – Gotse Delchev, Bulgarian and Macedonian revolutionary activist (d. 1903)
1873 – Étienne Desmarteau, Canadian shot putter and discus thrower (d. 1905)
1875 – Ludwig Prandtl, German physicist and engineer (d. 1953)
1877 – Eddie Cochems, American football player and coach (d. 1953)
1881 – Eulalio Gutiérrez, Mexican general and politician, President of Mexico (d. 1939)
  1881   – Fernand Léger, French painter and sculptor (d. 1955)
1883 – Reinhold Rudenberg, German-American inventor and a pioneer of electron microscopy (d. 1961)
1891 – M. A. Ayyangar, Indian lawyer and politician, second Speaker of the Lok Sabha (d. 1978)
1892 – E. J. Pratt, Canadian poet and academic (d. 1964)
1895 – Nigel Bruce, English actor (d. 1953)
1896 – Friedrich Glauser, Austrian-Swiss author (d. 1938)
  1896   – Friedrich Hund, German physicist and academic (d. 1997)
1897 – Ludwig Erhard, German soldier and politician, second Chancellor of West Germany (d. 1977)
1899 – Virginia M. Alexander, American physician and founder of the Aspiranto Health Home (d. 1949)
1900 – Jacques Prévert, French poet and screenwriter (d. 1977)

1901–present
1902 – Charles Lindbergh, American pilot and explorer (d. 1974)
  1902   – Hartley Shawcross, Baron Shawcross, German-English lawyer and politician, Attorney General for England and Wales (d. 2003)
1903 – Alexander Imich, Polish-American chemist, parapsychologist, and academic (d. 2014)
1904 – MacKinlay Kantor, American author and screenwriter (d. 1977)
1905 – Hylda Baker, English comedian, actress and music hall performer (d. 1986)
1906 – Dietrich Bonhoeffer, German pastor and theologian (d. 1945)
  1906   – Letitia Dunbar-Harrison, Irish librarian (d. 1994)
  1906   – Clyde Tombaugh, American astronomer and academic, discovered Pluto (d. 1997)
1908 – Julian Bell, English poet and academic (d. 1937)
1912 – Ola Skjåk Bræk, Norwegian banker and politician, Norwegian Minister of Industry (d. 1999)
  1912   – Erich Leinsdorf, Austrian-American conductor (d. 1993)
  1912   – Byron Nelson, American golfer and sportscaster (d. 2006)
1913 – Rosa Parks, American civil rights activist (d. 2005)
1914 – Alfred Andersch, German-Swiss author and publisher (d. 1980)
1915 – William Talman, American actor and screenwriter (d. 1968)
  1915   – Norman Wisdom, English comedian, actor and singer-songwriter (d. 2010)
1917 – Yahya Khan, Pakistan general and politician, third President of Pakistan (d. 1980)
1918 – Ida Lupino, English-American actress and director (d. 1995)
  1918   – Luigi Pareyson, Italian philosopher and author (d. 1991)
1920 – Janet Waldo, American actress and voice artist (d. 2016)
1921 – Betty Friedan, American author and feminist (d. 2006)
  1921   – Lotfi Zadeh, Iranian-American mathematician and computer scientist and founder of fuzzy logic (d. 2017)
1922 – Bhimsen Joshi, Indian vocalist of the Hindustani classical music tradition (d. 2011)
1923 – Conrad Bain, Canadian-American actor (d. 2013)
1925 – Russell Hoban, American author and illustrator (d. 2011)
  1925   – Stanley Karnow, American journalist and historian (d. 2013)
  1925   – Christopher Zeeman, English mathematician and academic (d. 2016)
1926 – Gyula Grosics, Hungarian footballer and manager (d. 2014)
1927 – Rolf Landauer, German-American physicist and academic (d. 1999)
1928 – Oscar Cabalén, Argentinian racing driver (d. 1967)
  1928   – Osmo Antero Wiio, Finnish journalist, academic, and politician (d. 2013)
1929 – Paul Burlison, American rockabilly guitarist (d. 2003)
  1929   – Neil Johnston, American basketball player (d. 1978)
1930 – Tibor Antalpéter, Hungarian volleyball player and diplomat, Hungarian Ambassador to the United Kingdom (d. 2012)
  1930   – Arthur E. Chase, American businessman and politician (d. 2015)
  1930   – Jim Loscutoff, American basketball player (d. 2015)
1931 – Isabel Perón, Argentinian dancer and politician, 41st President of Argentina
1935 – Wallis Mathias, Pakistani cricketer (d. 1994)
  1935   – Martti Talvela, Finnish opera singer (d. 1989)
  1935   – Collin Wilcox, American actress (d. 2009)
1936 – David Brenner, American comedian, actor, and author (d. 2014)
  1936   – Claude Nobs, Swiss businessman, founded the Montreux Jazz Festival (d. 2013)
1937 – David Newman, American director and screenwriter (d. 2003)
  1937   – Birju Maharaj, Indian dancer, composer, singer and exponent of the Lucknow "Kalka-Bindadin" Gharana of Kathak dance (d. 2022)
1938 – Frank J. Dodd, American businessman and politician, president of the New Jersey Senate (d. 2010)
1939 – Stan Lundine, American lawyer and politician, Lieutenant Governor of New York
1940 – George A. Romero, American director and producer (d. 2017)
1941 – Russell Cooper, Australian politician, 33rd Premier of Queensland
  1941   – Ron Rangi, New Zealand rugby player (d. 1988)
  1941   – Jiří Raška, Czech skier and coach (d. 2012)
1943 – Alberto João Jardim, Portuguese journalist and politician, second President of the Regional Government of Madeira
  1943   – Wanda Rutkiewicz, Lithuanian-Polish mountaineer (d. 1992)
  1943   – Ken Thompson, American computer scientist and programmer, co-developed the B programming language
1944 – Florence LaRue, American singer and actress
1944 – Alan Shields, American artist and ship captain (d. 2005)
1947 – Dennis C. Blair, American admiral and politician, third Director of National Intelligence
  1947   – Dan Quayle, American sergeant, lawyer, and politician, 44th Vice President of the United States
1948 – Alice Cooper, American singer-songwriter 
  1948   – Mienoumi Tsuyoshi, Japanese sumo wrestler
1949 – Rasim Delić, Bosnian general (d. 2010)
1951 – Patrick Bergin, Irish actor 
1952 – Jenny Shipley, New Zealand politician, Prime Minister of New Zealand
  1952   – Thomas Silverstein, American criminal and prisoner (d. 2019)
1955 – Mikuláš Dzurinda, Slovak politician, Prime Minister of Slovakia
1957 – Matthew Cobb, British zoologist and author
1958 – Tomasz Pacyński, Polish journalist and author (d. 2005)
1959 – Christian Schreier, German footballer and manager
  1959   – Lawrence Taylor, American football player
1960 – Siobhan Dowd, English author and activist (d. 2007)
  1960   – Jonathan Larson, American lyricist, composer, and playwright (d. 1996)
1961 – Denis Savard, Canadian ice hockey player and coach
1962 – Clint Black, American singer-songwriter, guitarist, and producer
1963 – Pirmin Zurbriggen, Swiss skier
1964 – Elke Philipp, German Paralympic equestrian
1965 – Jerome Brown, American football player (d. 1992)
1966 – Viatcheslav Ekimov, Russian cyclist
1967 – Sergei Grinkov, Russian figure skater (d. 1995)
1970 – Hunter Biden, American attorney and lobbyist, son of U.S. President Joe Biden
1971 – Rob Corddry, American actor, producer, and screenwriter
1972 – Dara Ó Briain, Irish comedian and television host
  1972   – Giovanni Silva de Oliveira, Brazilian footballer and manager
1973 – Oscar De La Hoya, American boxer 
  1973   – James Hird, Australian footballer and coach
  1973   – Manny Legace, Canadian ice hockey player and sportscaster
1975 – Natalie Imbruglia, Australian singer-songwriter and actress
1976 – Cam'ron, American rapper and actor
1977 – Gavin DeGraw, American singer-songwriter 
1979 – Giorgio Pantano, Italian racing driver
1980 – Raimonds Vaikulis, Latvian basketball player
1981 – Jason Kapono, American basketball player
  1981   – Johan Vansummeren, Belgian cyclist
1982 – Ivars Timermanis, Latvian basketball player
  1982   – Tomas Vaitkus, Lithuanian cyclist
1983 – Lee Stempniak, American ice hockey player
  1983   – Rebecca White, Australian politician
1984 – Sandeep Acharya, Indian singer (d. 2013)
  1984   – Mauricio Pinilla, Chilean footballer
1986 – Maximilian Götz, German racing driver
  1986   – Mahmudullah Riyad, Bangladeshi cricketer
1987 – Darren O'Dea, Irish footballer
  1987   – Lucie Šafářová, Czech tennis player
1988 – Carly Patterson, American gymnast and singer
1998 – Maximilian Wöber, Austrian footballer

Deaths

Pre–1600
 211 – Septimius Severus, Roman emperor (b. 145)
 708 – Pope Sisinnius (b. 650)
 856 – Rabanus Maurus, Frankish archbishop and theologian (b. 780)
 870 – Ceolnoth, archbishop of Canterbury
1169 – John of Ajello, Bishop of Catania 
1498 – Antonio del Pollaiuolo, Italian artist (b. 1429/1433)
1505 – Jeanne de Valois, daughter of Louis XI of France (b. 1464)
1508 – Conrad Celtes, German poet and scholar (b. 1459)
1555 – John Rogers, English clergyman and translator (b. 1505)
1590 – Gioseffo Zarlino, Italian composer and theorist (b. 1517)

1601–1900
1615 – Giambattista della Porta, Italian playwright and scholar (b. 1535)
1617 – Lodewijk Elzevir, Dutch publisher, co-founded the House of Elzevir (b. 1546)
1713 – Anthony Ashley-Cooper, 3rd Earl of Shaftesbury, English philosopher and politician (b. 1671)
1774 – Charles Marie de La Condamine, French mathematician and geographer (b. 1701)
1781 – Josef Mysliveček, Czech composer (b. 1737)
1799 – Étienne-Louis Boullée, French architect and educator (b. 1728)
1843 – Theodoros Kolokotronis, Greek general (b. 1770)
1891 – Pelagio Antonio de Labastida y Dávalos, Roman Catholic archbishop and Mexican politician who served as regent during the Second Mexican Empire (b. 1816)

1901–present
1905 – Louis-Ernest Barrias, French sculptor and academic (b. 1841)
1926 – İskilipli Âtıf Hodja, Turkish author and scholar (b. 1875)
1928 – Hendrik Lorentz, Dutch physicist and academic, Nobel Prize laureate (b. 1853)
1933 – Archibald Sayce, English linguist and educator (b. 1846)
1940 – Nikolai Yezhov, Russian police officer and politician (b. 1895)
1943 – Frank Calder, English-Canadian ice hockey player and journalist (b. 1877)
1944 – Arsen Kotsoyev, Russian author and translator (b. 1872)
1956 – Savielly Tartakower, Russian-French chess player, journalist, and author (b. 1887)
1958 – Henry Kuttner, American author and screenwriter (b. 1915)
1959 – Una O'Connor, Irish-American actress (b. 1880)
1968 – Neal Cassady, American novelist and poet (b. 1926)
1970 – Louise Bogan, American poet and critic (b. 1897)
1974 – Satyendra Nath Bose, Indian physicist, mathematician, and academic (b. 1894)
1975 – Louis Jordan, American singer-songwriter and saxophonist (b. 1908)
1982 – Alex Harvey, Scottish singer-songwriter and guitarist (b. 1935)
  1982   – Georg Konrad Morgen, German lawyer and judge (b. 1909)
1983 – Karen Carpenter, American singer (b. 1950)
1987 – Liberace, American singer-songwriter and pianist, (b. 1919)
  1987   – Meena Keshwar Kamal, Afghan activist, founded the Revolutionary Association of the Women of Afghanistan (b. 1956)
  1987   – Carl Rogers, American psychologist and academic (b. 1902)
1990 – Whipper Billy Watson, Canadian-American wrestler and trainer (b. 1915)
1992 – John Dehner, American actor (b. 1915)
1995 – Patricia Highsmith, American novelist and short story writer (b. 1921)
2000 – Carl Albert, American lawyer and politician, 54th Speaker of the United States House of Representatives (b. 1908)
2002 – Count Sigvard Bernadotte of Wisborg (b. 1907)
2003 – Benyoucef Benkhedda, Algerian pharmacist and politician (b. 1920)
2005 – Ossie Davis, American actor, director, and playwright (b. 1917)
2006 – Betty Friedan, American author and activist (b. 1921)
2007 – José Carlos Bauer, Brazilian footballer and manager (b. 1925)
  2007   – Ilya Kormiltsev, Russian-English poet and translator (b. 1959)
  2007   – Barbara McNair, American singer and actress (b. 1934)
  2007   – Jules Olitski, Ukrainian-American painter and sculptor (b. 1922)
  2007   – Alfred Worm, Austrian journalist, author, and academic (b. 1945)
2008 – Augusta Dabney, American actress (b. 1918)
  2008   – Stefan Meller, Polish academic and politician, Minister of Foreign Affairs of Poland (b. 1942)
2010 – Kostas Axelos, Greek-French philosopher and author (b. 1924)
  2010   – Helen Tobias-Duesberg, Estonian-American composer (b. 1919) 
2011 – Martial Célestin, Haitian lawyer and politician, first Prime Minister of Haiti (b. 1913)
2012 – István Csurka, Hungarian journalist and politician (b. 1934)
  2012   – Florence Green, English soldier (b. 1901)
  2012   – Robert Daniel, American farmer, soldier, and politician (b. 1936)
  2012   – Mike deGruy, American director, producer, and cinematographer (b. 1951)
  2012   – Susanne Suba, Hungarian-born watercolorist and illustrator, active in the United States (b. 1913)
2013 – Donald Byrd, American trumpet player (b. 1932)
  2013   – Reg Presley, English singer-songwriter (b. 1941)
2014 – Keith Allen, Canadian-American ice hockey player, coach, and manager (b. 1923)
  2014   – Eugenio Corti, Italian soldier, author, and playwright (b. 1921)
  2014   – Dennis Lota, Zambian footballer (b. 1973)	
  2015   – Fitzhugh L. Fulton, American colonel and pilot (b. 1925) 	
2016 – Edgar Mitchell, American captain, pilot, and astronaut (b. 1930)
2017 – Steve Lang, Canadian bass player (b. 1949)
  2017   – Bano Qudsia, Pakistani writer (b. 1928)
2018 – John Mahoney, English-American actor, voice artist, and comedian (b. 1940)
2019 – Matti Nykänen, Finnish Olympic-winning ski jumper and singer (b. 1963)
2020 – Daniel arap Moi, Former  President of Kenya (b. 1924)
2021 – Millie Hughes-Fulford, American astronaut, molecular biologist and NASA payload specialist (b. 1945)
2023 – Vani Jairam, Indian playback singer (b. 1945)
 2023 – Sherif Ismail, 53rd Prime Minister of Egypt (b. 1955)

Holidays and observances
Christian feast day:
Andrew Corsini
Gilbert of Sempringham
John de Brito
Goldrofe of Arganil
Blessed Rabanus Maurus
Rimbert
February 4 (Eastern Orthodox liturgics)
Day of the Armed Struggle (Angola)
Earliest day on which Ash Wednesday can fall, while March 10 is the latest; celebrated on the first day of Lent (Christianity)
Independence Day (Sri Lanka)
Rosa Parks Day (California and Missouri, United States)
World Cancer Day
International Day of Human Fraternity

References

External links

 BBC: On This Day
 
 Historical Events on February 4

Days of the year
February